SS John M. Harlan was a Liberty ship built in the United States during World War II. She was named after John M. Harlan, an Associate Justice of the Supreme Court of the United States.

Construction
John M. Harlan was laid down on 5 May 1943, under a Maritime Commission (MARCOM) contract, MC hull 1497, by J.A. Jones Construction, Brunswick, Georgia; sponsored by Mrs. Henry V. Mason, and launched on 29 August 1943.

History
She was allocated to Moore-McCormack Lines, Inc., on 16 September 1943. On 3 March 1948, she was laid up in the National Defense Reserve Fleet in Mobile, Alabama.

References

Bibliography

 
 
 
 
 

 

Liberty ships
Ships built in Brunswick, Georgia
1943 ships
Mobile Reserve Fleet